Lispeszentadorján is a village of 334 people (2005 population) in Hungary. It lies in the southern part of the Zala hills, close to the Slovenian and Croatian borders. The distance to Budapest is approx.  by car.

History
Lispeszentadorján was created in 1937 by the union of three villages: Lispe, Szentadorján and Erdőhát. It has one of the oldest written records in Hungary: in 1024 Stephen I of Hungary donated the village to the monastery of Zalavár. The most important event in the history of this small village was the discovery of the oil fields and the opening of the first industrial oil well in Hungary in 1937.

Tourist sites
 Roman Catholic church (Neo-Romanesque)
 Ruins of a monastery in the cemetery (16th century)
 The vine-cellars on the hilltop between Szentadorján and Maróc.

References

External links
 The official website of Lispeszentadorján

Populated places in Zala County